This is a list of museums in Singapore:

National museums
8Q SAM
Asian Civilisations Museum (ACM)
National Gallery Singapore
National Museum of Singapore
Peranakan Museum
Singapore Art Museum (SAM)

Other museums
Tools of Old Singapore Museum
ArtScience Museum (Marina Bay Sands)
Baba House (National University of Singapore)
The Battle Box
Fort Siloso (Sentosa)
Fuk Tak Chi Museum
Images of Singapore (Sentosa)
The Intan
JCU Museum of Video and Computer Games
Lee Kong Chian Natural History Museum (National University of Singapore)
Madame Tussauds Singapore (Sentosa)
Maritime Experiential Museum & Aquarium (Sentosa)
Mint Museum of Toys
Nei Xue Tang Museum
NUS Museum (National University of Singapore)
Parkview Museum
Red Dot Design Museum Singapore
The Republic of Singapore Navy Museum
Singapore Philatelic Museum (SPM)
Singapore Pinacothèque de Paris
Singapore Coins and Notes Museum (SCNM)
Sports Museum
The Gem Museum
Trick Eye Museum
Vintage Camera Museum

Heritage institutions
Chinatown Heritage Centre
Chinese Heritage Centre
Civil Defence Heritage Gallery
Heritage Conservation Centre {HCC)
Indian Heritage Centre (IHC)
Malay Heritage Centre
National Archives of Singapore (NAS)
Police Heritage Centre
Reflections at Bukit Chandu (RBC)
Science Centre Singapore
Singapore Chinese Cultural Centre
Singapore City Gallery (URA)
Singapore Discovery Centre
Sun Yat Sen Nanyang Memorial Hall
Teochew Cultural Centre

See also
 List of memorials in Singapore
 List of tourist attractions in Singapore

External links
National Heritage Board
Museums and heritage centres
National Heritage Board's List of Museums  (updated as of Nov 2021)

References

Singapore
 
Museums
Museums
Museums
Singapore